Dholer Raja Khirode Natta is a 1973 Bengali documentary film directed and written by Buddhadev Dasgupta.

References

External links
 

1973 films
Bengali-language Indian films
Indian documentary films
Films directed by Buddhadeb Dasgupta
1970s Bengali-language films